The Stewart Ministry was the combined Cabinet (called Executive Council of Alberta), chaired by Premier Charles Stewart, and Ministers that governed Alberta during the 4th Alberta Legislature from October 30, 1917, to August 13, 1921.

The Executive Council (commonly known as the cabinet) was made up of members of the Alberta Liberal Party which held a majority of seats in the Legislative Assembly of Alberta. The cabinet was appointed by the Lieutenant Governor of Alberta on the advice of the Premier.

List of ministers

See also 

 Executive Council of Alberta
 List of Alberta provincial ministers

References 

 

Politics of Alberta
Executive Council of Alberta
1917 establishments in Alberta
1921 disestablishments in Alberta
Cabinets established in 1917
Cabinets disestablished in 1921